Modafinil sulfone (code name CRL-41056) is an achiral, oxidized metabolite of modafinil, a wakefulness-promoting agent. It is one of two major circulating metabolites of modafinil, the other being modafinil acid. Modafinil sulfone is also a metabolite of the modafinil prodrug, adrafinil. Modafinil sulfone is also a metabolite of armodafinil, the (R)-(–)-enantiomer of modafinil, as oxidation to the sulfone removes the chiral center at the sulfur atom. Modafinil sulfone has been described as inactive, and similarly to modafinil acid, does not appear to contribute to the wakefulness-promoting effects of modafinil. However, like modafinil, modafinil sulfone was found to show anticonvulsant properties in animals, indicating that it does possess some biological activity.

References

Acetamides
Anticonvulsants
Benzhydryl compounds
Human drug metabolites
Sulfones